Jongué: A Nomad's Journey is a Canadian documentary film, directed by Carlos Ferrand and released in 2019. The film is a portrait of Serge Emmanuel Jongué, a French-Guyanese photographer who immigrated to Quebec in 1975 and became an important yet underrecognized figure in the province's arts scene until his death in 2006.

The film premiered in 2019 at the Montreal International Documentary Festival, before going into commercial theatrical distribution in 2020.

The film received three Prix Iris nominations at the 23rd Quebec Cinema Awards in 2021, for Best Sound in a Documentary (Benoît Dame, Catherine Van Der Donckt), Best Original Music in a Documentary (Claude Rivest) and the Public Prize.

References

External links

2019 films
2019 documentary films
Canadian documentary films
Quebec films
Documentary films about photographers
French-language Canadian films
2010s Canadian films